Chakvetadze is a Georgian surname. Notable people with the surname include:

 Anna Chakvetadze, Russian tennis player with Georgian origin
 Davit Chakvetadze, Georgian-born Russian Greco-Roman wrestler
 Giorgi Chakvetadze, Georgian footballer

Georgian-language surnames